The 2014 UEFA European Under-19 Championship was the 13th edition of the UEFA European Under-19 Championship since its reclassification from an under-18 event in 2002, and the 63rd since the tournament was created in 1948. Hungary was chosen to host the final tournament, which was staged from 19 to 31 July 2014 in four cities – Budapest, Felcsút, Győr and Pápa. It was the second time (first in the under-19 era) that the country held this tournament, having previously hosted it in 1990. Players born after 1 January 1995 were eligible to participate in this competition.

Qualification matches began in September 2013 and concluded in June 2014, with seven teams joining the hosts in the final tournament. Among them were the defending champions, Serbia, who defeated France 1–0 in the previous final to secure their first-ever title in UEFA competitions.

The best three teams from each group at the final tournament qualified for the 2015 FIFA U-20 World Cup in New Zealand.

Germany defeated Portugal 1–0 in the final to capture their third title.

Venues

The final tournament matches were held in four stadium venues located in four cities:

Qualification

Qualification for the final tournament occurred in two phases: a qualifying round and an elite round. During these rounds, 53 national teams competed to determine the seven teams that would join the automatically qualified host team, Hungary.

The qualifying round was played between 6 September and 19 November 2013, following a draw that took place on 5 December 2012 at the UEFA headquarters in Nyon, Switzerland. According to the UEFA under-19 national team coefficient ranking, the top seeded team, Spain, was given a bye to the elite round, whereas the remaining 52 teams were divided into two pots and drawn into 13 groups of four teams. Each group included two teams from both pots and was contested as a round-robin tournament, hosted by one of the group teams. The group winners and runners-up, along with the best third-placed team, qualified for the next round.

The elite round was played between 24 May and 10 June 2014 and was contested by the 27 teams advancing from the qualifying round plus Spain. The draw took place on 28 November 2013 at the UEFA headquarters and allocated the 28 teams – previously arranged into four seeding pots according to their qualifying round coefficient (Spain were automatically seeded in the first pot) – into seven groups of four. Each group was contested similarly to the qualifying round, with the seven group winners securing qualification for the final tournament.

Qualified teams
The following eight teams qualified for the final tournament:

1 Only counted appearances for under-19 era (bold indicates champion for that year, while italic indicates hosts)
2 As Serbia and Montenegro

Squads

Match officials
UEFA named six referees and eight assistant referees to officiate matches at the final tournament. Additionally, two referees from the host nation were chosen as fourth officials.

Referees
 Kevin Clancy (Scotland)
 Xavier Fernández (Spain)
 Tore Hansen (Norway)
 Enea Jorgji (Albania)
 Stephan Klossner (Switzerland)
 István Kovács (Romania)

Assistant referees
 Yashar Abbasov (Azerbaijan)
 Yevgeniy Belskiy (Kazakhstan)
 Laurent Conotte (Belgium)
 Darren England (England)
 Henrik Larsen (Denmark)
 Wayne McDonnell (Ireland)
 Ivo Nádvorník (Czech Republic)
 Gylfi Már Sigurðsson (Iceland)

Fourth officials
 Tamás Bognár (Hungary)
 Mihály Fábián (Hungary)

Group stage

The draw for the group stage was held on 19 June 2014 at the Pancho Arena in Felcsút, and was conducted by the UEFA Youth and Amateur Football Committee chairman, Jim Boyce, who was assisted by former Hungarian national team coach and final tournament ambassador Kálmán Mészöly.

The eight finalists were drawn into two groups of four teams (as hosts, Hungary were seeded in group A), where they played matches against each other in a round-robin system. The top two teams from each group advanced to the semi-finals.

Tie-breaking
If two or more teams were equal on points on completion of the group matches, the following tie-breaking criteria were applied:
 Higher number of points obtained in the matches played between the teams in question;
 Superior goal difference resulting from the matches played between the teams in question;
 Higher number of goals scored in the matches played between the teams in question;
If, after having applied criteria 1 to 3, teams still had an equal ranking, criteria 1 to 3 were reapplied exclusively to the matches between the teams in question to determine their final rankings. If this procedure did not lead to a decision, criteria 4 to 7 were applied.

If only two teams were tied (according to criteria 1–7) after having met in the last match of the group stage, their ranking would be determined by a penalty shoot-out.

All times are in Central European Summer Time (UTC+02:00).

Group A

Group B

Knockout stage
In the knockout stage, extra time and penalty shoot-out are used to decide the winner if necessary.

Bracket

Semifinals

Final

Goalscorers
6 goals
 Davie Selke

5 goals
 André Silva

2 goals

 Sinan Bytyqi
 Florian Grillitsch
 Hany Mukhtar
 Marcos Lopes
 Nemanja Maksimović

1 goal

 Markus Blutsch
 Valentin Grubeck
 Peter Michorl
 Levin Öztunalı
 Niklas Stark
 Marc Stendera
 Anthony Syhre
 Norbert Balogh
 Zsolt Kalmár
 Bence Mervó
 Szabolcs Varga
 Dor Hugi
 Gelson Martins
 Tomás Podstawski
 Romário Baldé
 Ivo Rodrigues
 Luka Jović
 Staniša Mandić
 Mykyta Burda
 Vyacheslav Tankovskyi

Team of the tournament

Goalkeepers
 André Moreira
 Bohdan Sarnavskyi
Defenders
 Kevin Akpoguma
 Srđan Babić
 Domingos Duarte
 João Nunes
 Niklas Stark
 Vukašin Jovanović

Midfielders
 Zsolt Kalmár
 Hany Mukhtar
 Levin Öztunali
 Tomás Podstawski
 Marc Stendera
 Radoslav Tsonev
 Michael Ohana
Forwards
 Gelson Martins
 Florian Grillitsch
 Davie Selke

Golden player:  Davie Selke

References

External links
 Official Site
 Official Programme

 
2014

UEFA European Under-19 Championship
2014 UEFA European Under-19 Championship
UEFA European Under-19 Championship
July 2014 sports events in Europe
2014 in youth association football